Educaedu is a company specialized in the search for academic training and employment through the network of portals that make it up. It is a leader in academic guidance and lead generation for students interested in preparing for a specific training program, with a presence in 20 countries and 11 markets.

In the training field, the group's online platforms have more than 150,000 courses in different areas offered by more than 1,000 training institutions, clients from all around the world. With more than 100 million visits per year, the group's websites generate around 5 million leads and it is estimated that the institutions that publish their courses in Educaedu generate around 800,000 enrollments a year. In its search and talent management portal, infoempleo, there are 6 million CVs registered.

The company has 150 employees distributed in its offices in Bilbao, Madrid, Barcelona, Santiago de Chile, Buenos Aires, Mexico City, São Paulo and Bogotá.

History 
The group was founded in 2001 in Spain by Fernando Bacaicoa and Mikel Castaños to solve a need in the education sector due to the lack of centralized supply. In 2008, Educaedu expanded internationally, becoming a global brand.

In 2010, the American investment fund Great Hill Partners became part of its capital, consolidating the company's position in the world.

In recent years, as part of its multi-brand strategy, the Educaedu Group has acquired new websites in the educational area and has expanded its business model by acquiring a portal specialized in job search, Infoempleo.es

Educaedu Group Services

Job search 
Candidates find jobs posted by more than 80,000 companies on different continents. They access reports and publications on the labor market and the educational field.

Academic Training 
Educaedu helps schools to attract potential students and bring them closer to their target audience by positioning their brands on Educaedu portals. It offers free access content, tools and services to users in order to guide students in choosing the most appropriate training according to their search.

Potential students find in a single platform various study alternatives, according to their interests, budgets and time availability and the opportunity to come into direct contact with more than one institution, obtain information and receive news related to their academic preferences.

What differentiates it from other similar portals is its concept of globalization. Educaedu is available in 20 countries and 9 languages.

Geographical scope

Countries where it is located 
Argentina, Chile, Mexico, Colombia, Brazil, Ecuador, Peru, Spain, Portugal, United Kingdom, France, Italy, Poland, Australia, Canada, Germany, Austria, Turkey, United States and Russia.

Languages 
Spanish, Portuguese, German, French, Italian, Polish, English, Turkish and Russian.

References

Spanish educational websites
2001 establishments in Spain